Norman Saul Matloff (born December 16, 1948) is an American professor of computer science at the University of California, Davis.

Early life
Norman Saul Matloff was born on December 16, 1948. Matloff received his Doctor of Philosophy degree in 1975 from the mathematics department at the University of California, Los Angeles under the supervision of Thomas M. Liggett. His dissertation was titled Equilibrium Behavior in an Infinite Voting Model.

Career
Matloff is the author of several books on computer science, statistics and programming, including

 The Art of R Programming
 The Art of Debugging with GDB, DDD and Eclipse
 Parallel Computing for Data Science: With Examples in R, C++ and Cuda
 Fast Lane to Python: A Quick, Sensible Route to the Joys of Python Coding
 Probability and Statistics for Data Science: Math + R + Data
 Statistical Regression and Classification: From Linear Models to Machine Learning
 Regression and Classification in R: A Careful, Thus Practical View

Matloff is also the author of many articles concerning machine learning, parallel computing and recommender systems. His just under 2000 citations amount to an h-index of 22.

Matloff also writes a blog. He views the increased use of H-1B visas in the high technology field as an unnecessary practice that harms the prospects of Americans in the field, and was featured in local American media on this topic. Gawker published an article on him "UC professor injects racism into H-1B debate" 

Matloff previously served as the Editor in Chief of the R Journal. He is the author of several software packages for the programming language R and holds a conservative view of R's development, discouraging premature exposure of students to the newer Tidyverse dialect of R. His views are supported by other academic teachers of the R language including Holger K. von Juanne-Diedrich, Jasper McChesney and a few others. However, academic debate contains many arguments for the use of Tidyverse and the dialect has won over most certifications in R.

Awards
In 2002, together with two colleagues, he was awarded the annual Distinguished Public Service Awards at UC Davis."Matloff has testified before the U.S. Senate and House of Representatives on immigration issues and has served as an expert witness in age-discrimination lawsuits. He has advised federal and state agencies, including the U.S. departments of Commerce and State and the White House, on employment issues. He has served on a number of panels and committees on computer-industry hiring practices sponsored by industry, academia, government and public interest groups."

Bibliography
 1988: Probability Modeling and Computer Simulation: An Integrated Introduction With Applications to Engineering and Computer Science (Duxbury Series) (Wadsworth) 
 1992: IBM Microcomputer Architecture and Assembly Language: A Look Under The Hood (Prentice Hall) 
 2007: The Art of Debugging With Gdb/Ddd: For Professionals and Students (No Starch Press) 
 2011: The Art of R Programming (No Starch Press)

References

 NEXT@CNN, Matloff interviewed on subject of H1-B and immigration of technology workers 28 September 2003
Norman Matloff: "Debunking the Myth of a Desperate Software Labor Shortage", 1998-2002
"UC professor injects racism into H-1B debate", 2008

External links
 UC Davis: Faculty profile
 Norman Matloff's H-1B and Offshoring Web Page
 Norman Matloff's Computer Science Web Page
 Norman Matloff's Immigration Forum
 Upon Closer Inspection (Matloff blog)
  (Gawker)

Living people
1948 births
University of California, Los Angeles alumni
University of California, Davis faculty
American whistleblowers
People from Los Angeles
Activists from California
R (programming language) people